Acmaeodera mixta is a species of metallic wood-boring beetle in the family Buprestidae. It is found in Central America and North America.

References

Further reading

External links

 

mixta
Articles created by Qbugbot
Beetles described in 1860